Maillebois is a commune in the Eure-et-Loir department in northern France. The Blaise, a tributary of the Eure, runs through the town.

Population

Places of interest
 Chateau de Maillebois, a registered monument
 Rouvray farm, a former Chateau Fort (which is a fortified building, like a fortress, but often also a practical building) and registered monument. It was a fort during the Hundred Years' War.
 Les Forges de Dampierre-sur-Blévy, a former foundry and a registered monument
 Dreux-Louvilliers Air Base is a former United States Air Force base near Maillebois

Famous residents
 Jean-Baptiste Francois des Marets, marquis of Maillebois, was a Marshal of France.
 Paul-Félix Armand-Delille, bacteriologist who introduced the myxomatosis virus in his estate of the château.
 Hubert Latham lived in the Chateau de Maillebois (the family home)

See also
Communes of the Eure-et-Loir department

Gallery

References

External links
 Town website
 Les Forges de Dampierre-sur-Blévy website

Communes of Eure-et-Loir